P. Prasad  is an Indian politician social worker and environmentalist from Kerala.  He is currently serving as a Minister for Agriculture Government of Kerala;  represents Cherthala constituency  in 15th Kerala Legislative Assembly. He is holding a responsible post as executive committee member of Communist Party of India.

Personal life
P. Prasad was born in 1969 as the son of G Parameswaran Nair and Gomatiamma at Palamel, Nooranad, Alappuzha district. His father Parameswaran Nair was an AITUC leader and a member of the CPI Alappuzha District Council. He completed his Bachelor of Science in Mathematics from N. S. S. College, Pandalam in 1989. He is married to Lyni and has two children, Bhagat and Aruna Almitra.

Political career 
P. Prasad started his public career through the All India Students Federation. While studying at Nooranad CBM High School, he became the AISF Taluk President. He also served as the AISF Unit Secretary of N. S. S. College, Pandalam. He has also served as AISF State President, AIYF State Executive Member, CPI Pathanamthitta district Secretary, All India Adivasi Mahasabha National Executive Member and University of Kerala Senate Member.

Prasad was the Additional Private Secretary of Forest Minister Binoy Viswam in 2011, he also acted as Janayugom Thiruvananthapuram Unit Manager. He was able to lead many environment related protests such as the agitation against the Aranmula International Airport project in Pathanamthitta. He also played a leading role in the Plachimada Coca-Cola struggle. He was able to give a new face to the anti-sand mining movement in the coastal areas of Arattupuzha and Thrikkunnapuzha in Alappuzha district with the participation of environmental activists. He also took part in the environmental protection struggles of Medha Patkar and Vandana Shiva and was an active volunteer in Narmada Bachao Andolan. He also serves as the Convener of the CPI State Environmental Sub-Committee and in that capacity he has taken strong stand against environmental concerns caused by encroachers at Kurinjimala Sanctuary, Munnar etc. He has visited Russia, Cuba, Nepal and South Africa as part of his political activities. Prasad was brutally beaten several times by the police and jailed for 34 days in student youth struggle.

He was the chairman of Kerala State Housing Board from 26 December 2016 to 9 March 2021.

Elections 
In the 2016 Kerala Legislative Assembly election P. Prasad contested his first elections to the State legislative assembly from the Haripad (State Assembly constituency) and lost by a margin of 18,621 against the Leader of the Opposition, Ramesh Chennithala.

In the 2021 Kerala Legislative Assembly election P. Prasad contested from the Cherthala (State Assembly constituency) as a Left Democratic Front candidate. He won the election by defeating Adv. S. Sarath from Indian National Congress by a margin of 6148 votes.

See also 

 P. Thilothaman
Aranmula International Airport

References 

Communist Party of India politicians from Kerala
Kerala MLAs 2021–2026
Living people
1969 births